The Hughes Borehole is an acid mine drainage site located near the southwest central borough of Portage, Pennsylvania in Cambria County.  In the 1920s, a hole was drilled in order to remove water from the myriad coal mines in the area.  In the 1950s, the bore hole was capped, but in the 1970s, enough pressure was established to blow off the cap.  As a result, an estimated volume of water in the range of 800 to 3,500 gallons per minute flows from the bore hole.  It is estimated that a daily amount of 8,000 pounds of dissolved metals has flooded a  area and pollutes the nearby Little Conemaugh River.

Today, this devastated area has been compared with that of the Yellowstone Mud Pots and resembles an area of eerie beauty.  All that remains is bare flooded and yellowish red soil periodically spotted with dead standing trees.  It also contains a large amount of green iron eating algae that adds to the color of the area.

Efforts are currently underway in an attempt to mitigate the situation.

References

External links 

 YouTube video of Hughes Bore Hole (7-22-2007)

Geography of Cambria County, Pennsylvania